Theresa Fitzgerald (born 6 August 1995) is an Australian handball player for Melbourne HC and the Australian national team.

She represented Australia at the 2019 World Women's Handball Championship in Japan, where the Australian team placed 24th.

References

Australian female handball players
1995 births
Living people